Dragon Age: Absolution is an adult animated fantasy television series created by Mairghread Scott for Netflix. Produced by Red Dog Culture House under the supervision of BioWare, the series was released on December 9, 2022. Set in BioWare's Dragon Age fictional universe, it focuses on the fallout from a heist gone wrong in the Tevinter Imperium.

Premise

Synopsis
After a heist to steal the Circulum Infinitus – an artifact fueled by blood magic – goes wrong, the mercenaries tasked with acquiring the artifact deal with the fallout.

Setting
The series is set in Thedas, a fictional world created for BioWare's video game series Dragon Age. The story will focus on characters within the Tevinter Imperium – a nation in the northern region of Thedas, which once subjugated southern Thedas during ancient times, and is governed by a powerful oligarchy of magic-wielding magisters led by an Imperial Archon. The Imperium is known for its strict caste system, which includes slavery. It is also known for its mages who practice sacrificial and forbidden blood magic. 

Chronologically, Absolution takes place after the conclusion of Dragon Age: Inquisition, as characters make reference to events in that game, but before the events of the upcoming video game Dragon Age: Dreadwolf.

Cast and characters
Main
 Kimberly Brooks as Miriam, an elven mercenary and escaped Tevinter slave.
 Matthew Mercer as Fairbanks, a freedom fighter. The character first appeared in a minor role in Dragon Age: Inquisition. 
 Ashly Burch as Qwydion, a light-hearted Qunari mage.
 Sumalee Montano as Hira, a human mage and former member of the Inquisition.
 Phil LaMarr as Roland, a warrior and ally of Miriam.
 Keston John as Lacklon, a dwarven fighter and Lord of Fortune.
 Josh Keaton as Rezaren Ammosine, a Tevinter magister who is seeking a mysterious artifact.
 Zehra Fazal as Tassia, Rezaren's lover and a Knight-Commander of the Templar Order.

Guest
 Miranda Raison as Cassandra Pentaghast, a member of the Seekers of Truth and a former companion of the Inquisitor. Raison reprises her role from Dragon Age II and Dragon Age: Inquisition.
 Jean Gilpin as Meredith, the former Knight-Commander of Kirkwall who was encased in red lyrium after she is defeated by Hawke. Gilpin reprises her role from Dragon Age II.

Episodes

Development

Production
Dragon Age: Absolution, an animated series set within BioWare's Dragon Age fictional universe, was announced at Netflix's June 2022 Geeked Week event. It was also announced that the show would be produced by Canadian company BioWare and Korean animation studio Red Dog Culture House and helmed by showrunner Mairghread Scott.

Release
The series was released on Netflix on December 9, 2022. A teaser trailer debuted during Netflix's "Geeked Week" event in June. A full trailer was released in November.

Reception

Pre-release 
Ash Parrish, for The Verge after the release of the trailer in November 2022, was optimistic about the quality animation and voice acting but was also curious about how the series might relate to the upcoming Dragon Age: Dreadwolf. Parrish highlighted that BioWare has done several series based on their various video game franchises, such as Dragon Age: Dawn of the Seeker and Dragon Age: Redemption, which feature characters who later appear in the corresponding video game series. She speculated that a character from the series could appear in some form in the forthcoming game as either a companion or an NPC, highlighting Miriam as a possibility for her narrative as a former elven slave.

Sisi Jiang, for Kotaku, commented that based on Cassandra Pentaghast's appearance in the trailer, they assume that Dragon Age: Absolution occurs after the video game Dragon Age: Inquisition. Jiang noted BioWare's prior incorporation of spin-off elements into Inquisition side quests, and thought the same could happen for Dragon Age: Dreadwolf.

Critical response 

Petrana Radulovic, for Polygon, commented that focus on characters is part of what makes the Dragon Age video game series "compelling"; likewise, the characters of this animated show jump "off the screen with stellar animation and superb voice acting" and that "while the characters are individually delightful, it's their relationships with one another that seal the deal". Radulovic called the show an "accessible [...] way into the franchise, teasing what makes it special without changing too much". However, she also commented on the short run of episodes and the "limited framework" the show has to work in to not make "assumptions" on player choices in previous games.

Alana Joli Abbott, for Paste, rated Absolution a 9.5/10 and stated that fans of the Dragon Age video game series will enjoy the "trip back to Thedas" while waiting for Dreadwolf; Abbott felt that newcomers who are "fans of adult narrative cartoons and fantasy" would also find "plenty" to enjoy in this show. Abbott highlighted the narratives featuring "LGBTQ romances and characters" as a particular draw to the show – she wrote that "the chemistry between Roland and Lacklon [...] is particularly well developed". Abbott also highlighted Qwydion who acts as "comic relief without ever undermining her character" and called Miriam "a compelling lead". She commented that Absolution has "vibes that mix" shows such as Avatar: The Last Airbender (2005), Carmen Sandiego (2019), and The Legend of Vox Machina (2022) and that the show "uses what's best in both fantasy and heist stories to create a compelling and character driven narrative".

Rafael Motamayor, for /Film, called the show "a hoot" and "a true gift to fans of the games" even though it wasn't as accessible for newcomers – he wrote that "it recreates the experience of playing an RPG, from the many kinds of romances, to the action almost feeling like it's turn-based, with a main party composed of your archetypical RPG classes". He commented that the heist story has an Ocean's Eleven (2001) feel and that the comedy seems similar in tone to Critical Role. Motamayor highlighted the kinetic animation by Red Dog Culture House with "dynamic fight choreography and camera work that feels distinct" from other animated shows such as Castlevania (2017) and The Legend of Vox Machina (2022).

Alyssa Mora, for IGN, stated that the show is a "memorable installment in the fantasy franchise" with an "excellent" cast and "compelling story beats"; she rated it a 7/10. However, Mora felt Absolution was "inaccessible to those unfamiliar with the series" unlike other animated adaptations such as Arcane (2021) and The Legend of Vox Machina (2022). Mora also commented on the limited time the show has which leaves "little room to breathe" as the characters go through their mission and that the relationship development between characters feels "fast-forwarded" – she wrote that "it only speaks to the strength of the writing that we're left wanting to see so much more".

Lauren Morton, for PC Gamer, also felt the show was inaccessible and in a rush as "Absolution just doesn't have enough time for its entire ensemble cast. It barely has enough time to string along its central plot, let alone three romantic relationships and a handful of flashbacks in less time than Robert Pattinson spent on screen as Batman this year". Morton commented that the Dragon Age video game series hinges on its characters and with fewer characters, any character in Absolution could have been "a new fan favorite". She did not feel the show was memorable which was "a real shame" especially as "Dragon Age spinoffs have historically been great".

Notes

References

External links 
 

2022 South Korean television series debuts
2020s South Korean animated television series
2022 Canadian television series debuts
2020s Canadian adult animated television series
2020s Canadian drama television series
Canadian animated action television series
Canadian adult animated adventure television series
Canadian adult animated drama television series
Canadian fantasy television series
LGBT-related animated series
Animated fantasy television series
Animated series based on video games
Animated television series by Netflix
Anime-influenced Western animated television series
Dragon Age
English-language Netflix original programming
Works based on Electronic Arts video games